Yasser Elbatrawy is an Egyptian orthopedist known for limb lengthening and reconstruction (LLR) surgery who operates the International Centre for Limb Lengthening and Reconstruction (CICLLR) in Cairo.

Elbatrawy has worked with specialists in limb lengthening: three years with Maurizio Catagni (an Ilizarov surgeon and founder of ASAMI, the Association for the Study and Application of the Methods of Ilizarov) in which he has earned ASAMI fellowship; two years with Dror Paley, John Herzenberg and Kevin Tetsworth, University of Maryland, Baltimore, MD, US, in which he studied for his doctoral degree in limb lengthening and reconstruction surgeries and the University of Maryland fellowship in pediatric LLR and bone deformity correction; and four months in Ilizarov Institute, Kurgan, Siberia, in 2000 where he earned the advanced diploma of Ilizarov surgeries.

Elbatrawy has been honoured in many international conferences: he earned a prize for the best research work on LLR from organizations such as SICOT (Paris, France, 2001) and European Conference on Trauma Surgery (Eurotrauma) (Gratz, Austria, 2007). Nationally, he has been honored by Al-Azhar University where he has attended the University Council and has been handed the University Shield in recognition of his significant role of publicizing the University globally. He was the youngest physician (at 29 years) to earn the State Encouragement Prize in 1997 for the sum of his research work published in international periodicals. He was then an assistant lecturer of orthopaedics, Faculty of Medicine for Girls, at Al-Azhar University. Nationally, he was honoured by Al-Azhar University, where he has attended the University Council and received the University Shield in recognition of his role in publicizing the University globally. Elbatrawy was chosen as Secretary-General for the Second International Congress on External Fixation in October 2007 in Cairo.

References

External links
 Photograph of Yasser Elbatrawy

Living people
Egyptian orthopaedic surgeons
University of Maryland, Baltimore alumni
Year of birth missing (living people)